Paroreia may refer to:
Paroreia (Arcadia), a town of ancient Arcadia, Greece
Paroreia (Thrace), a town of ancient Thrace, Greece